UB Stadium is a stadium in Amherst, New York on the campus of the University at Buffalo. It is primarily used for football, soccer, and track and field events, and is the home field of the Buffalo Bulls. It opened on September 4, 1993, with a game against the University of Maine.

The stadium was built from 1991 to 1993 as the final piece of the school's "Run to Division I" drive, meant to bring UB football back to Division I status and as the feature athletics venue for the 1993 Summer Universiade. The program had been dropped for seven years in the 1970s, but returned at a lower level. The team had played at a much smaller, 4,000-seat UB Stadium (now known as Walter Kunz Stadium) from the time of its move to the Town of Amherst north of Buffalo in 1985 until 1992. The current stadium opened in the summer of 1993, hosting the World University Games. The Bulls played their first six years in the stadium as a member of Division I-AA, finally making their return to Division I-A in 1999.

The stadium consists of a north-south field surrounded by an eight-lane track. There are the original double-decked grandstands on either sideline spanning the entire length of the football field, a large bleacher grandstand around the south end of the track, and two shorter bleacher sections on the north side with the free-standing scoreboard located between them. The stadium is lit by the four large light towers near the corners of the stadium.

Jim Kelly hosted his third-annual StarGaze charity event at the venue in 1994. The stadium was the primary venue for the 1995 World Masters Athletics Championships. The stadium hosted the opening ceremonies of the 2010 Empire State Games on July 21, 2010.

Location and configuration
The stadium is located at the east side of UB's North Campus. Students typically walk to the stadium from the Ellicott Complex, Greiner Hall, and the Governors Complex or take the UB Stampede buses directly to Alumni Arena, which is nearby.

UB Stadium has a capacity of approximately 25,000. The sideline seating areas consist of two main grandstands which hold 15,000 (7,500 each). A large bleacher grandstand in the southern end of the stadium has a seating capacity of approximately 10,000.  There is additional space on the north and south ends of the field level that is utilized as a standing room only space which accommodates approximately 3,000, though this is not factored into the capacity of the stadium.

In 1999, the school added two rounded bleacher sections to UB stadium, raising the capacity to above 29,000. The southern section holds 10,000. Two half-sections were constructed in the north endzone, both with a capacity of 3,000 each (6,000 total). In October 2017, demolition work commenced on the northern endzones of the stadium in preparation for the program's new , $18 million field house. The demolition of the bleachers brought the stadium's capacity down to about 25,000.

Attendance records

See also 
 Alumni Arena
 Amherst Audubon Field
 List of NCAA Division I FBS football stadiums

References

External links

 UB Stadium at UBAthletics.com

1993 establishments in New York (state)
American football venues in New York (state)
Athletics (track and field) venues in New York (state)
Buffalo Bulls football
College football venues
College soccer venues in the United States
College track and field venues in the United States
Soccer venues in New York (state)
Sports venues completed in 1993
Sports venues in Buffalo, New York
Sports venues in Erie County, New York
University at Buffalo